Mayor Duterte may refer to:

Rodrigo Duterte, mayor of Dávao (1988–1998, 2013–2016)
Sara Duterte, mayor of Dávao, (2010–2013, 2016–2019)